Below are the squads for the Football at the 1967 Mediterranean Games, hosted in Tunis, Tunisia, and took place between 7 and 17 September 1967.

Group A

Algeria
Coach:  Lucien Leduc

France B
Coach:

Italy B
Coach:  Paolo Todeschini

Morocco
Coach: Abderrahmane Mahjoub

Group B

Libya

Spain B

Tunisia

Turkey B

References

1967
Sports at the 1967 Mediterranean Games